Chembakur is a village near Ramasamudram mandal, located in Chittoor district of the Indian state of Andhra Pradesh.

Geography 

It has an average elevation of 500 metres (656 feet), and there is an unknown hill station nearby called Avulapalli konda, where the temperature falls to 5 °.

Demographics 

 census, had a population of 4,537. The total population constitutes 2,261 males and 2,261 females —a sex ratio of 1007 females per 1000 males. 511 children are in the age group of 0–6 years, of which 250 are boys and 261 are girls —a ratio of 1044 per 1000. The average literacy rate stands at 78.66% with 2,755 literates, significantly higher than the state average of 67.41%.

References

Villages in Chittoor district